Siékorolé is a village and seat of the commune of Séré Moussa Ani Samou in the Cercle of Yanfolila in the Sikasso Region of southern Mali. The village is 20 km northwest of Yanfolila.

References

Populated places in Sikasso Region